Gojko Kačar (born 26 January 1987) is a former Serbian footballer who played as a midfielder.

Club career
Kačar played for Vojvodina's youth academy before being promoted to the first team. In January 2008, he moved to Germany to play for Hertha BSC for a fee of €3 million, which made him the most expensive player that Vojvodina ever sold.

On 21 August 2010, Kačar debuted for Hamburger SV, coming on as a substitute for Eljero Elia in the 79th minute of a 2–1 home win against Schalke.

After an unsuccessful stint in Japan playing for Cerezo Osaka, on 19 July 2016, Kačar left Hamburg to join FC Augsburg.

In August 2018, Kačar joined the Cypriot club Anorthosis Famagusta. He retired in 2019.

International career
Kačar was called up to the Serbian U-21 team for the 2007 UEFA European Under-21 Football Championship in the Netherlands. He made his debut in a 0–2 loss to England, which was also his only match at the tournament.

On 7 September 2008, Kačar scored five goals for the Serbian U-21 team in an 8–0 demolition of Hungary in a qualifying match for the 2009 UEFA European Under-21 Football Championship. At the main tournament, he also scored once, but it was the only goal that Serbia ever scored.

Kačar represented Serbia at the 2008 Summer Olympics, making his debut against Australia on 7 August 2008.

In June 2010, he was selected in Serbia's squad for the 2010 FIFA World Cup, where he appeared in group stage match against Germany.

He went on to make 25 appearances at senior level.

Personal life
Kačar's two uncles, Slobodan and Tadija, are Olympic medalists in boxing. Slobodan won a gold medal at the 1980 Summer Olympics, while Tadija won silver in 1976.

Career statistics

Club

International

References

External links

 Gojko Kačar at bundesliga.de
 Player profile on Serbian National Team page 
 

1987 births
Living people
Footballers from Novi Sad
Serbian people of Bosnia and Herzegovina descent
Serbian footballers
Association football midfielders
2010 FIFA World Cup players
Serbia international footballers
Footballers at the 2008 Summer Olympics
Olympic footballers of Serbia
Serbia under-21 international footballers
Serbian SuperLiga players
Bundesliga players
J1 League players
FK Vojvodina players
Hertha BSC players
Hamburger SV players
Cerezo Osaka players
FC Augsburg players
Anorthosis Famagusta F.C. players
Serbian expatriate footballers
Expatriate footballers in Germany
Serbian expatriate sportspeople in Germany
Expatriate footballers in Japan